Raggio Di Luna or Moon Ray is an Italo disco project which included producers Aldo Martinelli and Fabrizio Gatto, and singers Simona Zanini and Mandy Ligios (who also recorded as "Comancero"). They are known for the song "Comanchero" (1984, Discotto S.A.S), which was a hit across Europe, reaching number 3 in West Germany, number 2 in Austria, number 4 in Switzerland and number 5 in France.

Discography

Singles

See also 
 Martinelli
 Radiorama
 Topo & Roby
 List of Italo disco artists and songs

References

External links 
 

Italo disco groups
Musical groups from Milan